Donald Allan Mattrick (born 13 February 1964) is a Canadian businessman and former CEO of social gaming company Zynga and formerly the president of the Interactive Entertainment Business at Microsoft. Prior to joining Microsoft in 2007, Mattrick served as the president of Worldwide Studios for Electronic Arts, where he worked for 15 years. In 1982, Mattrick founded Distinctive Software, which was acquired by Electronic Arts in 1991 and subsequently became EA Vancouver.

Distinctive Software, Inc.

In 1982, Mattrick and Jeff Sember co-founded Distinctive Software (DSI), creating the video game Evolution on the Apple II. Sember sold his equity stake in DSI to Mattrick in 1986. Paul Lee joined the board in the same year. In 1989, Paul Lee invested in DSI, becoming the only other shareholder, also taking on a full-time operating role as both the CFO and COO. In 1991, Mattrick was the chairman and the majority owner of DSI while Canadian businessman Tarrnie Williams served as CEO. In the prior year, DSI had received two unsolicited acquisition offers. Instead of accepting, Mattrick chose to reach out to Trip Hawkins, founder of Electronic Arts, to discuss synergies between the two companies, leading to the subsequent acquisition of DSI by Electronic Arts (EA) which was accomplished through a pooling of interest transaction in July, 1991. Prior to the acquisition, DSI was the largest independent game developer in North America and had 75 full-time employees working on various projects with companies like Konami, Broderbund, IBM, Disney, Mindscape and Accolade.

Electronic Arts
Mattrick served in a variety of leadership positions at Electronic Arts and, prior to leaving the company in 2005, served as the president of Worldwide Studios for Electronic Arts where he oversaw EA's global studios and research and development in several major sites, including Redwood Shores, California (Silicon Valley), EALA in Los Angeles, EA Tiburon in Florida, EA Canada in Vancouver, British Columbia, and Montreal, and EA UK in Chertsey, England.

Microsoft
Following his retirement from Electronic Arts in February 2007, Mattrick was asked by Robert J. Bach to serve as an external advisor to the Entertainment and Devices Division. In July 2007, Mattrick officially joined Microsoft as a senior vice president overseeing the Xbox 360 and PC gaming businesses, with his oversight apparently leading to an increase in video game installations and Xbox LIVE subscriptions.

Mattrick is also largely credited for his work in developing Kinect for Xbox 360. Mattrick unveiled Kinect under the code-name of "Project Natal" at E3 2009 on stage with Steven Spielberg to positive reception.

In October 2010, Mattrick was promoted to president of the Interactive Entertainment Business, overseeing a range of consumer businesses including Xbox 360, Xbox LIVE, Kinect, Music, and Video, as well as PC and mobile interactive entertainment.

In August 2011, Fortune magazine named Don Mattrick one of the "Smartest People in Tech 2011" largely highlighting his ability to turn around the Xbox business and drive new consumer innovations like Kinect. In May 2012, Don Mattrick was named one of CNN Money's top 10 brilliant technology visionaries.

On May 21, 2013, Mattrick unveiled the new Xbox One, the successor to the Xbox 360, an all-in-one entertainment system. He later dismissed criticisms of the system's "always on" internet connection by saying "We have a product for people who aren't able to get some form of connectivity; it's called Xbox 360."

Mattrick left Microsoft on July 1, 2013 to join Zynga as CEO and would eventually be replaced by Phil Spencer as Head of Xbox in 2014.

In Power On: The Story of Xbox, a web series documentary on Xbox released in December 2021, Mattrick commented on the Xbox One's controversial and unpopular launch strategy, admitting that the Xbox One reveal event was too focused on TV features and that he and his team "could have done a better job of reassuring people that we were committed to excellence in gaming."

Zynga
On July 1, 2013, it was confirmed that Mattrick was leaving Microsoft to join social game company Zynga as CEO. Wall Street investors thought positively of Mattrick's appointment and Zynga's shares skyrocketed on the day the news was made public. On his first quarterly financial earnings call with Zynga, on July 25, 2013, Mattrick predicted volatility for the company over the coming 6 months to one year, stating a need to "get back to basics" and "take a longer term view on our products and business."

By 2015, Zynga was struggling to make the intended gains in the mobile market and had seen its share prices fall. On April 8, 2015, it was announced that Mattrick had resigned as Zynga's CEO, "effective immediately," and was replaced by founder Mark Pincus, who called the departure "amicable".

References

External links
 

1964 births
Living people
Microsoft employees
Canadian video game designers
Electronic Arts employees
Businesspeople from Vancouver
Video game businesspeople
Video game programmers